A rigger is one who works on ropes, booms, lifts, hoists and the like for a stage production, film, or television show.

The term "rigger" originally referred to a person who attended to the rigging of a sailing ship.  In the age of sail, trading followed seasonal patterns with ships leaving port at set times of the year to make the most of winds.  When not at sea sailors would seek employment ashore.  Their skill with ropes and booms found use in the theatre.

The original canvas backdrops used in the theatre moved with ropes and pulleys, being developed from techniques used for sails.  It is from these roots that modern fly systems emerged.  This also gave rise to the tradition in British theatres of never whistling on stage as the riggers would use the same whistled instructions on stage as they did aboard ship. A misplaced whistle could be taken as an instruction to the riggers to change the set.

The term rigger is still used for people backstage in theatres, the road crew for a live concert, conventions and trade shows, and by extension to similar jobs such as those who are responsible for fastening chain motors (like CM Lodestar, EXE Rise, Chainmaster) by wire rope to the structural steel of a building.

With the birth of the film industry, just as stage actors adapted their techniques to the new medium so did those back stage. The complexity of the new environment giving rise to specializations such as those in the film industry who rig scaffolding for film sets and camera rigs; also termed as a standby rigger if they are on site and 'on call' all of the time.

Wire riggers
In the theater and film industry, a wire rigger is a worker in the special effects/stunts film crew who "flies" actors.  They are responsible for rigging special harnesses to attached wires which in turn are run through a series of "blocks" (pulleys) to a control area where a wire rigger raises, lowers or traverses an actor wearing the harness.  Wire riggers also rig up rails along which travels a "skate" from which the wire is attached.  Many plays and feature films (e.g. Peter Pan, Harry Potter, Superman) use this technique.

References

External links
wordpress.com, Production Team & Crew Glossary

Filmmaking occupations
Road crew